Deposition is the phase transition in which gas transforms into solid without passing through the liquid phase. Deposition is a thermodynamic process. The reverse of deposition is sublimation and hence sometimes deposition is called desublimation.

Applications

Examples 
One example of deposition is the process by which, in sub-freezing air, water vapour changes directly to ice without first becoming a liquid. This is how frost and hoar frost form on the ground or other surfaces. Another example is when frost forms on a leaf. For deposition to occur, thermal energy must be removed from a gas. When the air becomes cold enough, water vapour in the air surrounding the leaf loses enough thermal energy to change into a solid. Even though the air temperature may be below the dew point, the water vapour may not be able to condense spontaneously if there is no way to remove the latent heat.  When the leaf is introduced, the supercooled water vapour immediately begins to condense, but by this point is already past the freezing point.  This causes the water vapour to change directly into a solid.

Another example is the soot that is deposited on the walls of chimneys. Soot molecules rise from the fire in a hot and gaseous state. When they come into contact with the walls they cool, and change to the solid state, without formation of the liquid state. The process is made use of industrially in combustion chemical vapour deposition.

Industrial applications 
There is an industrial coatings process, known as evaporative deposition, whereby a solid material is heated to the gaseous state in a low-pressure chamber, the gas molecules travel across the chamber space and then deposit to the solid state on a target surface, forming a smooth and thin layer on the target surface. Again, the molecules do not go through an intermediate liquid state when going from the gas to the solid. See also physical vapor deposition, which is a class of processes used to deposit thin films of various materials onto various surfaces.

Deposition releases energy and is an exothermic phase change.

See also

References
 Gaja, Shiv P., Fundamentals of Atmospheric Modeling, Cambridge University Press, 2nd ed., 2005, p. 525 
 Moore, John W., et al., Principles of Chemistry: The Molecular Science, Brooks Cole, 2009, p. 387 
 Whitten, Kenneth W., et al., Chemistry, Brooks-Cole, 9th ed., 2009, p. 7 
 

Phase transitions